Cashtown is an unincorporated community in Franklin County, in the U.S. state of Pennsylvania.

History
Cashtown had approximately 50 inhabitants in 1878.

References

Unincorporated communities in Franklin County, Pennsylvania
Unincorporated communities in Pennsylvania